CAMP responsive element binding protein 3 like 1 is a responsive element binding protein that in humans is encoded by the CREB3L1 gene.

Function 
The protein encoded by this gene is normally found in the membrane of the endoplasmic reticulum (ER). However, upon stress to the ER, the encoded protein is cleaved, and the released cytoplasmic transcription factor domain translocates to the nucleus. There it activates the transcription of target genes by binding to box-B elements. [provided by RefSeq, Jun 2013].

References

Further reading